Maverick Messiah: A Political Biography of N.T. Rama Rao is the biography of N. T. Rama Rao written by journalist Ramesh Kandula and published in January 2021. It is an analytical account of the role of the actor-turned-politician Nandamuri Taraka Rama Rao, popularly known as NTR, who founded Telugu Desam Party (TDP) in 1982 in the united Andhra Pradesh and stormed to power in an unprecedented victory.

Written by Ramesh Kandula, a Hyderabad-based journalist, the book has been published by Penguin Random House India and was formally released in India in January 2021 by vice-president of India Venkaiah Naidu. The book is available in Hardcover and in Kindle format.

About the book 
NTR's political career spanned less than 14 years, but the imprint he left in that rather short period was remarkable, the book says. But NTR's rather dramatic entry into politics, the profound impact he left on the people of Andhra Pradesh and the vital role he played in national politics during his relatively short political life have not received deserving recognition. The book deals with these aspects in depth.

NTR waged an uncompromising fight against the Indian National Congress all through his political life and it could be said that he was the original proponent of 'Congress-mukt' Bharat philosophy. According to the author, NTR's most significant contribution was in the area of Centre-state relations, which constituted his core political philosophy. NTR was not the first politician to talk about federalism in the Indian context but the credit for pushing Centre-state relations into the mainstream agenda should largely be accorded to him. The political biography also discusses in detail the complexity of the political personality of NTR, who dressed like a Hindu sanyasi but remained secular to the core in his public life.

Reception 

Maverick Messiah was met with positive responses from media outlets.

Journalist Nidheesh M.K. hailed the work as a valuable contribution to a growing body of English-language volumes on regional politicians and saw it as a good look into Rama Rao and other politicians' use of populist tactics. Writing in The Wire, journalist and writer Parsa Venkateshwar Rao Jr called the book "a good example of how a political biography/history should to be written", praising Kandula's admiring but ultimately journalistic perspective and attention to detail. R. Ravikanth Reddy of The Hindu perceived the book as a demonstration of Rama Rao's role in the downfall of the Congress party, and stated the book "explores some unknown facets of his life". In a review for the journal Commonwealth & Comparative Politics, researcher Carolyn Elliot found Maverick Messiah to be a "worthy and balanced portrayal" or Rama Rao, and particularly commended the dramatic narrative, replies to common criticisms of his governance, and exploration of his policies and response to crises.

During his book release speech, Vice-president Venkaiah Naidu said that as someone who was closely involved with NTR during some of the most tumultuous days of his political stint, he could say that the author, as a political biographer, had been accurate and neutral in his depiction of events.

References

2021 non-fiction books
Penguin Books India books
Indian biographies